Robert N Goodman (born 1953) is Professor of Brain and Behavioural Medicine at the Institute of Psychiatry in the Department of Child and Adolescent Psychiatry, King's College London.  He is a UK child psychiatrist specializing particularly in hemiplegia and online psychiatric screening. He is a member of the Royal College of Physicians, and was awarded a Fellowship of the Royal College of Psychiatrists in 1987.

Robert is the primary inventor of the SDQ Strengths and Difficulties Questionnaire and the Development And Wellbeing Assessment or DAWBA.

References 

British child psychiatrists
Academics of King's College London
1953 births
Living people